Blood Out is a 2011 American direct-to-video action film written by Jason Hewitt and John A. O'Connell and starring Val Kilmer and Luke Goss. The film is Hewitt's directorial debut.

Premise 
Small town Cop Michael Savion (Luke Goss) gets stone-walled by big city detectives led by Hardwick (50 Cent) when he asks them to investigate his younger brother's death. After his brother's death he swears vengeance in a flashback where he fires his gun in the rain over his dead body. His brother David (Ryan Donowho), a gangster, was murdered by members of his own gang for having wanted to quit the gang lifestyle in order to marry Gloria (a gang members sister), and for being suspected of 'ratting' out his gangs activities. Savion takes off his badge and goes vigilante to seek justice for the death of his brother, and crosses paths with Arturo (Val Kilmer), the leader of an international ring involved in human trafficking.

Cast
 Luke Goss as Michael
 Tamer Hassan as Elias
 AnnaLynne McCord as Anya
 Vinnie Jones as Zed
 50 Cent as Hardwick
 Val Kilmer as  Arturo
 Ed Quinn as Anthony
 Ryan Donowho as David
 Ambyr Childers as Medic
 Michael Arata as Detective
 Jesse Pruett as Methhead
 Bobby Lashley as Hector
 Stephanie Honore as Gloria

Production
Filming began May 10, 2010 on locations in Baton Rouge, Louisiana.

Vinnie Jones appears in the film. Despite reports of an earlier conflict with actor Tamer Hassan, both were quite amicable on and off the set.

WWE Wrestler Bobby Lashley stars in the film.

As an unusual method of "clearing his head" on set after "flubbing" an occasional line of dialog, Val Kilmer would briefly break into dog-like barks and howls.

Lionsgate/Grindstone acquired distribution rights for the U.S. and Canada while Lionsgate U.K. acquired distribution right for the UK,  and has announced tentative plans for an end-of-year domestic release of the film.

Soundtrack
The film was scored by Jermaine Stegall, and features the single "Hells Gates" by Colin C. Allrich under his Slighter alias.  Also T. Lee from DesFly Entertainment song called "Im The Shit.

Release
The film was released on DVD and Blu-ray in America on April 26, 2011.

References

External links
 
 Podcast interview with Jason Hewitt

2011 films
2011 crime drama films
2011 crime thriller films
2011 direct-to-video films
2011 directorial debut films
2011 drama films
2010s English-language films
American crime drama films
American crime thriller films
American direct-to-video films
American gang films
Lionsgate films
2010s American films